Transverse fissure can refer to:
 Porta hepatis or transverse fissure of liver
 Horizontal fissure of right lung (or 'horizontal fissure')
 Horizontal fissure of cerebellum